Jacques Kinkomba Kingambo (born 4 January 1962) is a retired Congolese football midfielder. He was a squad member at the 1988 and 1992 Africa Cup of Nations.

References

1962 births
Living people
Democratic Republic of the Congo footballers
Democratic Republic of the Congo international footballers
1988 African Cup of Nations players
1992 African Cup of Nations players
S.C. Eendracht Aalst players
R.F.C. Seraing (1904) players
Sint-Truidense V.V. players
RFC Liège players
R.C.S. Verviétois players
Association football midfielders
Democratic Republic of the Congo expatriate footballers
Expatriate footballers in Belgium
Democratic Republic of the Congo expatriate sportspeople in Belgium
Belgian Pro League players
21st-century Democratic Republic of the Congo people